The Lakshmi Narasimha Swamy temple is located on the banks of Pennar river in Penna Ahobilam, Anantapur District of Andhra Pradesh, India.

Location 
The Lakshmi Narasimha Swamy temple is located in Anantapur district of Andhra Pradesh, India. It is located 220 km from Nandyal and about 185 km from Kurnool, the district headquarters, 41 km from Anantapur and is 12 km away from Uravakonda.

One of temples of Lakshmi narasimha swamy is also at Somaghatta village, Gorantla, Anantapur.

History of the temple 

The temple was built on the footprint of Lord Lakshmi Narasimha Swamy measuring 5 feet 3 inches.

Temple times are 8.00am to 11.00am and 5.30pm to 8.30pm.

The temple is a popular location for marriage ceremonies.

A grand car festival is conducted annually in the month of April.

Gallery

References 

Hindu temples in Anantapur district